El Dorado School District may refer to:

 El Dorado School District (Arkansas), based in El Dorado, Arkansas
 El Dorado School District (Kansas),  based in El Dorado, Kansas.
 El Dorado Union High School District, based in El Dorado County, California.